Angela Steenbakkers (born 3 June 1994) is a Dutch handballer for HSG Blomberg-Lippe and the Dutch national team.

References

External links
 

1994 births
Living people
Sportspeople from Venlo
Dutch female handball players
Expatriate handball players
Dutch expatriate sportspeople in Germany
21st-century Dutch women